Manuel Antonio National Park is a small national park in the Central Pacific Conservation Area located on the Pacific coast of Costa Rica, just south of the city of Quepos, Puntarenas, and  from the national capital of San José. Established in 1972, the local community sought conservation to prohibit development of the natural environment for tourist attraction. They also protested the beach restrictions on locals by foreign owners. With a land area enumerating 1,983 ha, it is the smallest of any Costa Rican national park. The park caters to as many as 150,000 visitors annually, and is well known for its beautiful beaches and hiking trails. In 2011, Manuel Antonio was listed by Forbes as among the world's 12 most beautiful national parks.

Features of the park

This park has impressive landscapes and several coves with many white-sand beaches and lush foliage amidst great mountains and forests that reach the beaches. Additionally, it is located in a tropical forest.

Known for its excellent climate and scenic beauty, the park is visited by a large number of national and international tourists. The park is currently developing adequate infrastructure to support visitors, with emphasis on harmony with nature to reduce visual impact and follow strict environmental protection. Some buildings have been designed by renowned bioclimatic architects Ibo Bonilla and Rafael Víquez, including the Visitor Centre and the Casa de Guarda Parques. The park is also crossed by a network of trails equipped with universal accessibility facilities, rest areas, and scenic overlooks.

The trails are adapted for people in wheelchairs.

Beaches 

Four beaches are contained within the limits of the park: Manuel Antonio, Espadilla Sur, Tesoro, and Playita. The first is separated from the second by a "tombolo", or natural land bridge formed by sand accumulations. It is a roughly hour-long hike from Espadilla to the top of Punta Catedral (100 m). Both Manuel Antonio and Espadilla Sur contain tidal pools and offer the possibility of snorkeling.

There is a lifeguard program, but precaution must be taken, as rip currents do occur.

Biodiversity 

Although Manuel Antonio National Park is Costa Rica's smallest national park, the diversity of wildlife in its  is unequaled with 109 species of mammals and 184 species of birds. Both brown-throated three-toed sloth and Hoffmann's two-toed sloth are a major feature, as are three of Costa Rica's four monkey species — the mantled howler monkey, Central American squirrel monkey, and Panamanian white-faced capuchin monkey. Other species found in the park include black spiny-tailed iguana, green iguana, common basilisk, white-nosed coati and many snake and bat species. Included in the 184 bird species are toucans, woodpeckers, potoos, motmots, tanagers, turkey vulture, parakeets and hawks.  Dolphins can be observed there, as well as the occasional migrating whale. Scuba diving, snorkeling, sea kayaking, mountain biking, and hiking provide opportunities to experience the tropical wildlife that enriches Manuel Antonio.

Manuel Antonio was previously Costa Rica's second most visited park behind the Poás Volcano National Park which lies very close to San José, the country's largest urban area. However, due to recent eruptions, Poás Volcano is closed indefinitely, making Manuel Antonio the most visited national park in Costa Rica.

Access 
The main access road route is through Route 618 from Quepos.

The park is open every day except Tuesdays. They are also open for holidays like Christmas, New Year's, and Easter; if the holiday falls on a Tuesday, it will be closed for that day.

As of May 4th 2021, SINAC is the sole seller of park admissions. Tickets can only be bought online and with a valid form of ID.

See also
List of national parks of Costa Rica
Tourism in Costa Rica

References

External links

 Manuel Antonio Welcome Center

National parks of Costa Rica
Protected areas established in 1972
Geography of Puntarenas Province
Tourist attractions in Puntarenas Province
Isthmian–Pacific moist forests